, also known as Mount Hotakadake, is one of the 100 Famous Japanese Mountains as coined by the media, reaching a height of . Mount Hotaka is situated in Japan's Hida Mountains and all its major peaks except Mount Maehotaka, lie on the border between the cities of Matsumoto, Nagano Prefecture, and Takayama, Gifu Prefecture. This mountain is located in Chūbu-Sangaku National Park.

The peaks of Okuhotaka, Karasawa, Kitahotaka, Maehotaka and Nishihotaka are called the Hotaka Mountains. The highest peak in this range, and also the tallest mountain in both Nagano and Gifu prefectures, is Mount Okuhotaka.

Peaks
  is the highest peak in the Hotaka Mountain Range and the third highest in Japan after Mount Fuji and Mount Kita.
The triangulation point on the top is at  while the peak reaches .
, on the mountain's west face, is a well-known, prominent, rocky area of Japan. Near the summit lies the Kitahotaka Hut.
The tip of the Kita Ridge is called .
There are many climbing routes in this area.
It is surrounded by many similarly rocky peaks which makes it difficult to discriminate visually.
  is the western peak of Karasawadake, rising . The winter ascend route to Mount Okuhotaka passes here.

History 
 1880 - William Gowland climbed Mount Myōjin, guided by local hunter Kamijō Kamonji.
 1893 - Kiyohiko Tate climbed Mount Maehotaka, then Walter Weston climbed Mount Maehotaka. Walter Weston published Mountaineering and Exploring in the Japanese Alps (1896) and introduced Japanese mountains to the world.
 1906 - Gunji Abe climbed Mount Okuhotaka at first.
 1912 - Walter Weston climbed Mount Okuhotaka.
 December 4, 1934 - The region in this mountain was specified for the Chūbu-Sangaku National Park.

Hiking routes

Even though the Hotaka Mountains are often climbed during times of lingering snow, like Golden Week, the following routes are strictly for snow-free periods. When snow has fallen, the area becomes extremely dangerous. Routes may become impassable, so special care is required.

The mountain climbing base at Karasawa lies in a U-shaped cirque dominated by Mount Okuhotaka, Mount Maehotaka and the Tsuri Ridge connecting the two. Because it lies on the northern side of the mountains, snow remains throughout the year.

In the south, a ridge stretches from Mount Okuhotaka via Mount Nishihotaka to Mount Yake. The Tsuri Ridge runs from Mount Okuhotaka to Mount Maehotaka, from where a path leads down through a cirque to the bridge Kappabashi in Kamikōchi. Climbing down on the Gifu side, either from the  through  or taking the Shinhotaka Ropeway from next to Nishihotaka-dake, the road and  can be reached in the valley below.

Beginner 
 Mount Okuhotaka
Kamikōchi ―  ―  ―  ― Karasawa Cirque― Mount Okuhotaka
Kamikōchi ― Lake Myōjin ― Tokusawa ― Panorama course (Byōbunoatama) ― Karasawa Cirque― Mount Okuhotaka
(Note that in both cases the part from Karasawa to Mount Okuhotaka is actually more at the intermediate level)
 Mount Kitahotaka
Kamikōchi ― Lake Myōjin ― Tokusawa ― Yokoo ― Karasawa Cirque― Mount Kitahotaka
 
Shinhodaka Onsen ― Shinhotaka Ropeway ― Nishiho Mountain Cottage ―  ― Nishihodoku
Kamikōchi ―  ― Nishiho Mountain Cottage ― Maruyama ― Nishihodoku

Intermediate 
 Mount Maehotaka - Mount Okuhotaka
Kamikōchi ― Dakesawa Mountain Hut ―  ― Mount Maehotaka ― Mount Okuhotaka

The ascent from the Dakesawa Hut to Kimikodaira, is the steepest in the Japanese Alps. There is no water on this ascent, and if climbing both mountains, the route to Mount Okuhotaka and Mount Maehotaka via Karasawa is more popular.

Advanced 
 Yarihotaka traverse route
Mount Yari―  ―  ―  ―  ―  Mount Kitahotaka ― Mount Karasawa ― Mount Okuhotaka ―  ― Mount Aino ― Mount Nishihotaka ― Nishihodoku

Mountain huts 
There are various alpine huts in the Mount Hotaka area:

See also
 List of mountains in Japan
 List of Ultras of Japan
 100 Famous Japanese Mountains
 Three-thousanders (in Japan)
 Kamikōchi
 Mount Yari
 Hida Mountains - Chūbu-Sangaku National Park
 Tourism in Japan
Karasawa Cirque

References

External links

 Topographic map (1:25,000)
 "Hotaka-dake, Japan" on Peakbagger

Hotaka, Mount
Mount Hotaka
Hotaka, Mount
Hotaka, Mount
Mount Hotaka
Takayama, Gifu
Highest points of Japanese national parks